Ihor Oleksiyovych Nahornyi (born 22 May 1995) is a Ukrainian professional footballer who plays as a left-back for Ukrainian club Ahrobiznes Volochysk.

References

External links
 Profile on Ahrobiznes Volochysk official website
 
 

1995 births
Living people
People from Cherkasy Oblast
Ukrainian footballers
Association football defenders
FC Dynamo-2 Kyiv players
FC Arsenal-Kyivshchyna Bila Tserkva players
FC Bukovyna Chernivtsi players
FC Karpaty Halych players
FC Ahrobiznes Volochysk players
Ukrainian First League players
Ukrainian Second League players
III liga players
Ukrainian expatriate footballers
Expatriate footballers in Poland
Ukrainian expatriate sportspeople in Poland